The Cornwerdermolen is a smock mill in Cornwerd, Friesland, Netherlands which has been restored to working order. The mill is listed as Rijksmonument number 39329.

History

The Cornwerdermolen was built in 1907 by millwright J H  Westra of Franeker. The mill originally drained two polders, each via a separate Archimedes' screw. Five windmills were put out of work by the construction of the Cornwerdermolen and were demolished. The smaller of the two screws was later removed. The mill was restored in 1969. it worked until 13 November 1972, when it lost two sails in a storm. Thereafter the work of the mill was done by an Archimedes' screw driven by a tractor. The tractor was later replaced by an electric motor. The mill was restored in 1999. It is the most westerly windmill in Friesland.

Description

The Cornwerdermolen is a three-storey smock mill on a single-storey base. There is no stage, the sails reaching almost to the ground. The mill is winded by tailpole and winch. The mill in winded by a tailpole and winch. The windshaft also carries the brake wheel which has 59 cogs. This drives the wallower (34 cogs) at the top of the upright shaft. At the bottom of the upright shaft, the crown wheel (103 cogs) drives the Archimedes' screw via a gearwheel with 37 cogs. The axle of the Archimedes' screw is  diameter and the Archimedes' screw is  diameter. Each turn of the screw lifts  of water.

Public access
The Cornwerdermolen is open to the public by appointment.

References

Windmills in Friesland
Windmills completed in 1907
Smock mills in the Netherlands
Rijksmonuments in Friesland
Súdwest-Fryslân
Octagonal buildings in the Netherlands